Salmothymus is a genus name of fish in the family Salmonidae, established for the Adriatic trout (Salmothymus obrusirostris). More commonly, however, the species is considered a member of the wider genus Salmo, i.e. Salmo obtusirostris.   Salmothymus thus is a junior synonym of Salmo, not in current use.

References 

Salmonidae
Obsolete vertebrate taxa
Taxonomy articles created by Polbot